Paola Roxelin Cruz Alvarado (born 8 August 1995) is a Bolivian futsal player and a footballer who plays as a right back. She has been a member of the Bolivia women's national team.

International career
Cruz represented Bolivia at the 2013 Bolivarian Games and the 2014 South American U-20 Women's Championship. At senior level, she played the 2014 South American Games.

References

1995 births
Living people
Women's association football fullbacks
Bolivian women's footballers
Bolivia women's international footballers
Competitors at the 2014 South American Games
Bolivian women's futsal players
South American Games bronze medalists for Bolivia
Competitors at the 2018 South American Games